San Gervasio may refer to:

Italian and Spanish for Saint Gervasius
San Gervasio (Capriate San Gervasio), a subdivision of Capriate San Gervasio, Italy
Capriate San Gervasio, in the province of Bergamo, Italy
Palazzo San Gervasio, in the province of Potenza, Italy
San Gervasio Bresciano, in the province of Brescia, Italy
San Gervasio (Maya site), an archaeological site of the Maya civilization, located on the island of Cozumel, Mexico